Eudonia octophora is a species of moth of the family Crambidae. It was named by Edward Meyrick in 1884. It is endemic to New Zealand.

The wingspan is 22–24 mm. The forewings are brownish-ochreous, irrorated with dark fuscous, forming dark lines on the veins. There are a few white scales. The first line is pale, dark-margined posteriorly and the second line is whitish and also dark-margined. The hindwings are ochreous-grey-whitish, with the postmedian line and apex greyer. Adults have been recorded on wing in December, January and March.

References

Eudonia
Moths of New Zealand
Moths described in 1884
Endemic fauna of New Zealand
Taxa named by Edward Meyrick
Endemic moths of New Zealand